In compilers, live variable analysis (or simply liveness analysis) is a classic data-flow analysis to calculate the variables that are live at each point in the program. A variable is live at some point if it holds a value that may be needed in the future, or equivalently if its value may be read before the next time the variable is written to.

Example 
Consider the following program:

 b = 3
 c = 5
 a = f(b * c)

The set of live variables between lines 2 and 3 is {b, c} because both are used in the multiplication on line 3. But the set of live variables after line 1 is only {b}, since variable c is updated later, on line 2. The value of variable a is not used in this code.

Note that the assignment to a may be eliminated as a is not used later, but there is insufficient information to justify removing all of line 3 as f may have side effects (printing b * c, perhaps).

Expression in terms of dataflow equations 

Liveness analysis is a "backwards may" analysis. The analysis is done in a backwards order, and the dataflow confluence operator is set union. In other words, if applying liveness analysis to a function with a particular number of logical branches within it, the analysis is performed starting from the end of the function working towards the beginning (hence "backwards"), and a variable is considered live if any of the branches moving forward within the function might potentially (hence "may") need the variable's current value. This is in contrast to a "backwards must" analysis which would instead enforce this condition on all branches moving forward.

The dataflow equations used for a given basic block s and exiting block f in live variable analysis are the following:

: The set of variables that are used in s before any assignment.

: The set of variables that are assigned a value in s (in many books, KILL (s) is also defined as the set of variables assigned a value in s before any use, but this does not change the solution of the dataflow equation):

The in-state of a block is the set of variables that are live at the start of the block. Its out-state is the set of variables that are live at the end of it. The out-state is the union of the in-states of the block's successors. The transfer function of a statement is applied by making the variables that are written dead, then making the variables that are read live.

Second example 

The in-state of b3 only contains b and d, since c has been written. The out-state of b1 is the union of the in-states of b2 and b3. The definition of c in b2 can be removed, since c is not live immediately after the statement.

Solving the data flow equations starts with initializing all in-states and out-states to the empty set. The work list is initialized by inserting the exit point (b3) in the work list (typical for backward flow). Its computed in-state differs from the previous one, so its predecessors b1 and b2 are inserted and the process continues. The progress is summarized in the table below.

Note that b1 was entered in the list before b2, which forced processing b1 twice (b1 was re-entered as predecessor of b2). Inserting b2 before b1 would have allowed earlier completion.

Initializing with the empty set is an optimistic initialization: all variables start out as dead. Note that the out-states cannot shrink from one iteration to the next, although the out-state can be smaller than the in-state. This can be seen from the fact that after the first iteration the out-state can only change by a change of the in-state. Since the in-state starts as the empty set, it can only grow in further iterations.

References

Compiler optimizations
Data-flow analysis
Static program analysis